The Yokosuka Tenga (天河, "Milky Way") was a proposal to provide the Imperial Japanese Navy with a jet-powered bomber towards the end of World War II. The concept was to replace the piston engines of the P1Y1 with turbojets. 

The powerplant selected was the  thrust Ishikawajima Ne-30, then under development. However, before a single example could be built, both the Ne-30 project and the Tenga were cancelled due to technical difficulties with the turbojet design.

See also
Related development
Yokosuka P1Y
Comparable aircraft
Arado Ar 234

References

Citations

Bibliography

 Miranda, Justo and P. Mercado. Unknown! No. 3. Madrid, Spain: Self-published.

1940s Japanese experimental aircraft
Tenga, Yokosuka
Tenga